Telecommunications towers in the United Kingdom are operated mainly by Arqiva. Arqiva operates the transmitters for UK terrestrial TV and most radio broadcasting, both analogue and digital. BT also operates a number of telecommunications towers in the UK.

BT
BT's towers were, at one time, the backbone for a national line-of-sight microwave telecommunications network. One of the most famous of these is the BT Tower in London. However, the introduction of fibre optic network technology rendered these microwave towers largely obsolete for their original purpose. Nowadays they tend to be used mainly for relatively low capacity fixed links to customer sites and mobile telephony.

List of BT towers
BT Group owns at least 200 radio masts and towers in Britain. Of these, fourteen are reinforced concrete towers. The rest are of steel lattice construction.

Seven of the fourteen are of similar design, known as the 'Chilterns' type, after the first one which was built at Stokenchurch on the Chiltern Hills.
They are identical except for their heights, which vary considerably. They are at:

The other seven are:

Mobile phone
Below the level of the major telecommunications towers, mobile phone operators run roughly 23,000 base stations. In urban areas, these are almost all rooftop sites or microcells, but in rural areas these are often on towers, frequently owned by BT or Arqiva. The Sitefinder database is an incomplete list of mobile phone base stations in the UK.

Since the discontinuation of the Ofcom sitefinder website in 2015, Estate Systems Ltd have developed a comprehensive site www.mastdata.com for use by the public and mobile operators (subject to a fee) which locates masts within the UK and Northern Ireland.

Arqiva sold its mast business for telecoms to Cellnex. They no longer operate in this area.

Military
There are also numerous military communications sites in the UK, operated by various wings of the armed forces. Many of the masts and towers at military sites are now marketed to commercial site sharers by Arqiva.

History
The first UK microwave relay towers were built in about 1952 for a television link between Manchester and Kirk o'Shotts near Glasgow. A chain of 14 towers, known as "Backbone", running from the Chilterns to Scotland and intended primarily for national defence in the Cold War, was first mentioned publicly in the 1955 Defence White Paper. It announced "The Post Office are planning to build up a special network, both by cable and radio, designed to maintain long distance communication in the event of an attack". It wasn't actually built until the early 1960s, by which time the original Backbone concept had become absorbed into a much larger microwave network built for a mixture of civil and defence traffic including voice, telegraphy, television and radar.

See also
 British Telecom microwave network
 BT site engineering code
 Radio masts and towers
 Telecommunications in the United Kingdom
 Telecom infrastructure sharing

References

External links
 National Grid Wireless
 Arqiva
 Mastdata (Estate systems Ltd)
 NTL Wireless Solutions
 Sitefinder: UK mobile phone base station database
 The Towers of Backbone
 Collaction at Skyscraperpage.com

Communication towers in the United Kingdom